This is a list of all golfers who have played in the Curtis Cup for the Great Britain and Ireland team through 2022.

Players 

^ In the final team but did not play in any matches.

The name in brackets is another surname used by the player.

See also 
List of American Curtis Cup golfers
Lists of golfers

References

Great Britain
Curtis Cup, Great Britain
Curtis Cup
Curtis Cup
Curtis Cup
Curtis Cup
Golf